Nazariy Volodymyrovych Muravskyi (born 3 February 2000) is a Ukrainian professional football defender who plays for Lviv in the Ukrainian Premier League.

Career
Born in the Baranivka Raion of the Zhytomyr Oblast, Muravskyi began to play in the local Youth Sportive School Baranivka and continued his youth career in Kyiv and Donetsk youth sportive school systems.

After joined Shakhtar Donetsk academy in April 2017, and played almost three years for the FC Shakhtar Donetsk Reserves and Youth Team in the Ukrainian Premier League Reserves Championship and in February 2020 went on loan to FC Mariupol in the Ukrainian Premier League. Muravskyi made his début for FC Mariupol in the Ukrainian Premier League as a substituted player in a losing away match against FC Desna Chernihiv on 29 February 2020.

International career
Muravskyi was a part of the Ukraine national under-18 football team, but not made debut for this youth representation, instead it happened in May 2018 for the Ukraine national under-19 football team.

References

External links
 
 

2000 births
Living people
Ukrainian footballers
FC Shakhtar Donetsk players
FC Mariupol players
FC Lviv players
Ukrainian Premier League players
Association football defenders
Ukraine youth international footballers
Ukraine under-21 international footballers
Sportspeople from Zhytomyr Oblast